Constantino Roberto Santos Jardim (born 15 November 1967), known as Constantino, Tino or Tino Bala, is a Portuguese former professional footballer who played as a striker.

Club career
Born in Lubango, Portuguese Angola, Constantino amassed Primeira Liga totals of 140 matches and 48 goals over seven seasons, representing in the competition S.C. Salgueiros, Leça F.C. and S.C. Campomaiorense. Whilst with the second club he always scored in double digits in the top division, helping it consecutively retain its league status but being relegated in 1998 due to financial irregularities.

In January 2000, after an unsuccessful one-and-a-half-year spell in Spain with Levante UD, the 32-year-old Constantino returned to his country, joining Campomaiorense. He retired five years later, in amateur football.

References

External links

1967 births
Living people
People from Lubango
Angolan people of Portuguese descent
Portuguese footballers
Association football forwards
Primeira Liga players
Liga Portugal 2 players
Segunda Divisão players
S.C. Salgueiros players
R.D. Águeda players
C.D. Aves players
C.F. União de Lamas players
Leça F.C. players
S.C. Campomaiorense players
C.D. Tondela players
Segunda División players
Segunda División B players
Levante UD footballers
Portuguese expatriate footballers
Expatriate footballers in Spain
Portuguese expatriate sportspeople in Spain
Portuguese expatriates in Angola